Bruce Mahler  is an American actor, producer, and writer. He is known for his role as Sgt. Fackler in the comedy films Police Academy, and as Rabbi Glickman on the sitcom Seinfeld.

Biography
In 1977, Mahler appeared on two episodes of the TV series Fernwood 2 Night. In 1980, he appeared on Fridays, an early 1980s ABC sketch show modeled after NBC's Saturday Night Live, where most of his appearances showcased his musical talent and radio DJ-style voice, most notably in the recurring sketches "The Latin DJ" and the one-off sketches "KPLO" (about Palestine Liberation Organization terrorists hosting a radio show in their bunker) and "A Classical Get-Down" (about a classical pianist who hosts his radio show like a Top 40 station).

Two years after Fridays was cancelled, Mahler portrayed Sgt. Douglas Fackler in the 1984 film Police Academy. His other film work has included 1984's Friday the 13th: The Final Chapter, the 1985 sequel Police Academy 2: Their First Assignment, the American sitcom Diff'rent Strokes, 1986's Police Academy 3: Back in Training, 1987's Funland, and the 1989 sequel Police Academy 6: City Under Siege.

In the 1990s, Mahler appeared on the television series The Famous Teddy Z and had a recurring role on Seinfeld. He had minor roles in the movies Hook, Dick Tracy and Loaded Weapon 1. From 1995 to 1998, he starred as a rabbi whom Elaine befriends in the Seinfeld episodes "The Postponement", "The Hot Tub" (scene deleted), "The Serenity Now" and "The Finale".

Filmography

References

External links

American male film actors
American male television actors
American television writers
American male television writers
Living people
American sketch comedians
Comedians from New York City
20th-century American comedians
21st-century American comedians
Screenwriters from New York (state)
Year of birth missing (living people)